The Scintex ML 250 Rubis was a French civil utility aircraft of the 1960s.

Design and development
Scintex Aviation had manufactured the two-seat Emeraude from the late 1950s. In 1960 the firm designed the ML 145 four-seat low-wing cabin monoplane, powered by a 145 h.p. Continental O-300-B engine, the single example of which first flew on 25 May 1961. 
 
Scintex developed the ML 250 with a larger five-seat cabin and fitted with a  Lycoming O-540 engine. This first flew on 3 June 1962. The aircraft was of a graceful design, using an all-wood construction, having a semi-monocoque plywood-covered fuselage and cantilever tapered low wing. The tail fin was swept and the aircraft, unusually, was fitted with a fully retractable tailwheel undercarriage.

Production and service
Eight production examples of the ML 250 Rubis were completed by Scintex during 1964-1965. Whilst the type had an advanced specification, it suffered from competition from contemporary all-metal aircraft types such as the Piper Comanche. The Rubis has remained in service with French private pilots and four were airworthy in 2005. Two of these, including the aircraft pictured right (F-BJMD) were still active on the French civil aircraft register in 2015.

Specifications

References

Notes

Bibliography

1960s French civil utility aircraft
Low-wing aircraft
Single-engined tractor aircraft
Aircraft first flown in 1962
Conventional landing gear